Reginald Barnes Jr, aka Reggie Barnes (born c. 1961) is a retired professional freestyle skateboarder and Founder/CEO of Eastern Skateboard Supply, the largest skateboard wholesale company in North America. Known as a "virtuoso" teen amateur, Barnes skated professionally from 1980 to 1991, with the Pepsi-Cola Pro Skateboard Team, Walker Skateboards, and Dogtown Skateboards. There were three Reggie Barnes' skateboards issued, two with Walker and one with Dogtown.

Early life 
Barnes is from Cary, North Carolina and attended Cary High School. He first became interested in skateboarding through Sports Illustrated. Barnes said, "I read an article about this guy [Gregg Weaver skating] barefoot in drained swimming pools and I knew it was something I wanted to do."

In 1976 when he was 14, Barnes purchased his first skateboard, a Super Surfer with clay wheels, from a neighbor for $2. That was quickly replaced with a used skateboard with metal wheels—one that he says worked better on asphalt. He became a member of the Wizard Skate Team, an amateur team supported by the Wizard Skate Park in Raleigh, North Carolina, but moved on as he progressed. Barnes says in those early days of skating, "We were constantly emulating surfing. [The style] was very different from today's street skating."

Barnes' specialty became freestyle; this form of skating with music to match his handstands, wheelies, and kick-flips suited Barnes, who said, "I'm a show-off, but that's part of being a skater" Barnes spent "hours on end" alone with a boombox, practicing his routines. One of his favorite places to practice was the open air basketball courts at North Carolina State University.

Amateur skateboarding 
Two years later, Barnes had become one of North Carolina's top skaters, taking sixth place in freestyle in his first National Skateboard Association Contest, the U.S. Open Skateboard Competition in Jacksonville, Florida in March 1978. Barnes "caught the attention of the seasoned professionals" when he skated at the Oceanside Amateur Freestyle Contest in June 1978, despite only coming in fifth place. 

He joined the team for Powerflex, a skateboard wheel company based in California, getting equipment and travel expenses in return for participating in demonstrations and competitions. Powerflex offered a salary, but Barnes said, "I kinda want to stay amateur and work toward the 1980 Olympic exhibition team."

In September 1978, as part of Team Powerflex, Barnes participated in the Pepsi/Nova Team Challenge. Barnes had "a dynamic freestyle routine" earning 285 points and placing 1st in the age 16–19 Freestyle contest. Rodney Mullen, generally considered the best freestyle skateboarder of all time, placed 1st in the 13–15 category with 263 points.

Barnes "was known as a 'virtuoso' up and down the East Coast by the time he graduated from Cary High School in 1979." Barnes says, "I learned to ride on my hands, and word of mouth just spread." In the spring of 1979, Pepsi called his parents and asked if their son could tour the country, giving demonstrations as part of the Pepsi-Cola Pro Skateboard Team. Although the call from Pepsi was a complete surprise, it was the era of the cola wars, and Pepsi executives thought skateboarding was a good fit to their "Pepsi Generation" ad campaign. With just a few months of his senior year remaining, Barnes decided to graduate first.

Professional skateboarding 
Barnes became a professional skateboarder in June 1979. He skated with the Pepsi Pro Skateboard Team on their second tour, performing as many as five demonstrations a day and 100 demonstrations across the summer. Pepsi was among the first to pay skateboarders well, but getting paid made Barnes a pro which would keep him out of the Olympic Games and other amateur competitions. However, Barnes says he did not feel like a "real pro" because he had yet to win money in competition."

When the summer tour ended, Barnes took the money he earned from Pepsi and moved to Huntington Beach California. Barnes says, "I was determined to compete against the 'real' pros' and try to win money." However, Barnes had picked a challenging time to go pro. Editor of the National Skateboard Review, Di Dootson explains, "By early 1979, the insurance industry had effectively closed many skateparks across the country." This negatively impacted retail shops, competitions, and companies like Barnes sponsor Powerflext which had shut down. 

Barnes had to wait six months before there was a flatland contest. Without Powerflex's backing, Barnes had to personally pay the $50 entry fee for his first pro competition, the Oasis Freestyle Contest in San Diego in 1980. He came in fifth place, earning $50. Barnes says, "It was not about the money, but the guys I was competing with." The standing world champion Chris Chadwick took third. Also in his first pro event, Rodney Mullen took first. Admittedly homesick, Barnes said, "I felt like I could go home to North Carolina having accomplished what I set out to do."

Barnes signed with sponsor Walker Skateboards in 1980. Bruce Walker was a noted East Coast pro, and his company was the first of its kind to be owned and operated by a skater. Walker paid for Barnes to fly to California for competitions, allowing Barnes to live in Wilmington North Carolina where he could focus on both skateboarding and surfing in his home state.

Although he performed many demonstrations, Barnes only competed three times during his first three years as a pro because there were only a few contests. His second pro event was in 1981 at Magic Mountain where "the main attraction was the pro-freestyle event". Barnes, who came in third place, told Thrasher magazine, "Good energy and crowds, back east they don't have much going on like this, so it's good fun for a change of sceneries. Lots of fun."

The third time he competed as a pro was at the 1984 Sundeck Pro-Am Skateboard Challenge in Kona Skatepark, Florida—Barnes came in first place. He won even though they played the wrong music for his first routine. Barnes said, "I just kept going." Later that year, he placed second at the NSA Finals at the Del Mar Skate Ranch in California. However, according to Thrasher magazine, he almost ended up in the third place—a miscalculation of the scores by the judges was caught by Barnes' girlfriend, Chrissie, and corrected.

In 1986, a group of skateboarding magazines selected Barnes as one of the top five American freestyle skateboarders. That same year, Barnes was a featured demonstrator at Expo 86, the World's fair held in Vancouver, Canada. 

Despite owning and running Eastern Skateboard Supply and Endless Grind in 1987, Barnes continued to compete professionally. He placed third in freestyle at the World Cup, Münster Monster Mastership, in Germany in 1987. In a 2010 online conversation, pro-skating superstars Joachim ‘YoYo’ Schulz and Stefan ‘Lillis’ Akesson recalled this competition with a few words: Schulz, who came in seventh, wrote, "Check out the results page—a who is who in skateboarding. Some names are still around to this day! Even Reggie Barnes made it over. Stoked!." To which Akesson replied, "4th place for me... I really like the skating of Reggie, and he is a super nice person!"

In 1989, Barnes' rank had slipped to seventh best freestyle skater in the United States. Yet, at the NSA's Savanah Slamma in May 1989, Thrasher noted, "Reggie Barnes, for a man who hadn't skated since the Arizona finals [in December 1988], ripped." The decline in his freestyle skating was a mix of his now being a businessman and his increased interest in streetstyle, which emerged as a modified version of freestyle that was better suited for urban settings. Barnes indicated that it was difficult to complete effectively in freestyle when he was actively demonstrating streetstyle—the two styles even required different skateboards. Barnes competed professionally until 1991. 

Although retired, he continued demonstrate skating, and supported new skateboarders through Endless Grind and Eastern Skateboard Supply. November 1, 2000, Barnes was one of three judges for the Freestyle World Championships Contest and Reunion, the first Pro/Am freestyle event in almost ten years, held at the Embarcadero, San Francisco, California. One outcome of this event, which also served as a reunion of former skaters, was the creation of the World Freestyle Skateboard Association.

Sponsors and skateboards 
Barnes' first sponsor was Powderflex Wheels. Although their product was good, Powerflex was negatively impacted by the decline in skateboarding, closing by 1980 when Barnes became a pro. Later, Bones Wheels became his sponsor. Converse was another sponsor, and Barnes usually skated in Carolina blue, high-top Chuck Taylor All-Stars. He was also sponsored by Gotcha Sportswear.

As a professional skater signed to Walker Skateboards, Barnes endorsed a line of skateboards. The Reggie Barnes' Pro Freestyle Skateboard was available in 1985. The 1987 model featured "tailbones" or heavy plastic bumpers under both ends, and his signature Anubis graphic—an Egyptian god Anubis on a skateboard, surrounded by hieroglyphics, including a Tar Heel footprint to symbolize his North Carolina origins. The Reggie Barnes' Street Skate came out in 1989 and featured a kicked 4-inch nose and a new graphic of a mummy breaking out of a neon–yellow coffin with an Anubis graphic on the lid. Barnes earned $1 for each skateboard purchased in his Walker line.

Later, Barnes skated for Dogtown Skateboards who also issued a Reggie Barnes model. The 1990 Reggie Barnes Skateboard graphic is of a cartoon–style trashcan with two hands lifting the lid from inside. At the base of the trashcan is a broken green telephone and fishbones.

Competitions 
This incomplete list includes known NSA and international competitions in which Barnes competed.

Filmography 
In the 1980s, Unreel Productions produced a series of videos documenting the National Skateboard Association's championship competitions. Released in 1986, Skateboard: NSA '86 Summer Series Volume 4: Oceanside Street Attack showed highlights of the Oceanside, California Freestyle Contest, including Barnes' entire fifth place routine.

In 2006, Pantheon Home Video released License to Skate!, a five-part series of how-to videos that featured Reggie Barnes and other early pro skaters with Walker, including Chris Baucom, Chuck Dinkins, Joe Humeres, Jim McCall, Tim Morris, Bill Robinson, and Paul Schneider.

Barnes was a stunt double for several films produced in Wilmington, North Carolina, including David Lynch's Blue Velvet (1986), Stephen King's Maximum Overdrive (1986), and Teenage Mutant Ninja Turtles (1990) where he doubled for Donatello riding a skateboard.

Barnes is featured in the East Coast Motions vol 1, a 2018 documentary that features Steve Caballero and Barnes in the 1986 Endless Grind / Bones Brigade Skateboard Showdown in Raleigh, North Carolina, along with the 1985 Record Bar Pro-Am ASP Surf Tour at Wrightsville Beach, North Carolina.

Other ventures

Eastern Skateboard Supply 
In 1985, Raleigh businessmen Skip Flythe approached the 24-year-old Barnes about starting a skateboard distribution company. As the only professional skater in North Carolina, Barnes had the industry contacts, while Flythe had the line of credit. Before entering a deal, Barnes contacted his mentor Bruce Walker, who owned a small distribution business in Florida, along with his skateboard company. According to Barnes, Walker said, "Thank you for asking me, but go ahead and do it. …If you don't do it, someone else will." Years later, when Walker decided to retire, he sold his distribution company to Barnes.

Eastern Skateboard Supply started as a 50–50 partnership in 1985, representing just one brand and gradually adding others. After eighteen months, Barnes made an offer to buy out Flythe, becoming the sole owner of Eastern in 1987. However to pay Flythe for his half of the business, Barnes had to borrow money from his parents because no bank would give him a loan. By 1990, the company grossed around $5 million. As of 2021, Eastern Skateboard Supply's annual sales are $24.64 million in the United States. The company's headquarters are in Wilmington, North Carolina, with additional warehouses in Florida and Texas.

When Tony Hawk decided to produce a "lower-priced skateboard to help keep Birdhouse and the team alive," he contacted Eastern and his "old friend Reggie Barnes" to produce and distribute Birdhouse to skate shops. Some other brands Eastern carries include Enjoi, Hook-Ups, Plan Band Zero. The company has also diversified and carries surfing supplies. 

Eastern works with its brands to promote skating. In 2007, Pro-skater Pat Duffy said "Reggie Barnes wanted to do a 10-day, 6 demo tour with maybe 1 or 2 people from a couple of his brands. So it was me from Plan B, Chet Childress, Jason Adams, Kyle Berard, Adam Dyet, Mike Peterson, Willy Santos. ...Reggie Barnes is the biggest distributor on the East Coast and he’s been hooking us up and selling our boards for years, so we may as well go and give a little bit back. And it was such a good tour for 10 days, and then in Wilmington, which is where the distribution is, I met up with the whole team, and with that crew plus the Plan B crew, we did a huge Reggie Barnes-Eastern Skate Supply demo. It was INSANITY." This European tour included Madrid, Hamburg, Rotterdam, and Amsterdam—reflecting Eastern's expansion into the European market.

Barnes hires employees who are experienced with skateboarding, including former pro-skater Ray Underhill, once a member of the Bones Brigade with Tony Hawk. As a perk for employees, the Wilmington warehouse includes a 20,000-square foot private skatepark. Started as a half-pipe in the warehouse, Eastern's corporate skatepark has one of the biggest bowls on the East Coast, designed and built in birch by Team Pain Skateparks in 2007. To celebrate the completion of the skatepark, Barnes hosted twenty of the country's top skaters for demos and signings for more than 1,000 members of the public. Barnes says. "I wanted a place where pros can practice and film and this skate park is ideal for it."

Endless Grind 
In 1986, Barnes opened Endless Grind, a retail skateboard shop in downtown Raleigh, North Carolina, with two Raleigh businessmen, Homer Croom and Skip Flythe. However, he bought out his partners in 1987. The shop's name refers to the sound the metal axle makes as skateboarders swing around the upper edge of an empty swimming pool. Because of his connections with pro-skaters, Barnes frequently brings famous names to his store for demonstrations. He also sponsors an amateur Endless Grind team and organizes local competitions.

Scott Bourne said, "I was really fortunate in that where I grew up; we had Reggie Barnes’ shop... Because he had such influence, he brought like World Industries and lots of teams; whoever was big came through NC on tour to Endless Grind skate shop. A lot of guys came out of there—Chet Childress, Kenny Hughes, Neal Hendrix. And you had a whole younger generation too, like Lennie Kirk. But Reggie really brought the industry to the middle part of the Eastern U.S." Barnes also brought Bones Brigade member Steve Caballero to Endless Grind, turning it into an opportunity for a Bones Brigade / Endless Grind Skateboard Showdown.

Mike Sinclair of ESPN's Real Street, started as a skater for the Endless Grind Team, eventually working in the store and managing the store-sponsored team for Barnes.

Outrigger canoes 
In 2015, Barnes decided to introduce Hawaii's outrigger canoe culture to Wilmington. He purchased two outrigger canoes and placed them at Wrightsville SUP, a rental facility so that he could take his family and friends canoeing. Barnes' efforts were successful—there is now a ninety-member Wrightsville Beach Outriggers Canoe Club. Bernadette Burton, coach of the team, says "Reggie coined the name, and we formed a 501(c)(3). We found men’s and women’s coaches, got out into the community and made it our goal to put together a team that could join the East Coast Outrigger Canoe Association, travel up and down the coast, and compete in races."

Image and legacy 
Although not known as an innovator like some of his contemporaries, Barnes did influence his contemporaries and many of the next generation of East Coast skaters:

 Skater Tommy Harward's first freestyle exposure was at Barnes's school demonstration in 1987. Barnes not only encouraged young Harward to keep skating but also gave Harward one of his skateboards. Later, the Tommy Haward pro model skateboard by Outlook was reportedly based on the Reggie Barnes' Freestyle model by Walker.
 In the 1980s, amateur skater Bill Robinson (known today as Dr. Skateboard) decided to go to college because the skateboarding industry declined. After college, Robinson contacted "Reggie Barnes who helped resurrect his career," and soon Robinson was a pro-skateboarder signed with Barnes' sponsor Walker Skateboards. Robinson eventually won three Masters Freestyle championships and was inducted into the Freestyle Skateboarding Hall of Fame in 2010.
 In 1985, Chuck Dinkins lived in Memphis, Tennessee and worked for a skateboard shop. In conjunction with a festival at the fairgrounds, his employer arranged for pro skaters Barnes and Jim McCall to demonstrate freestyle. Dinkins says, "Jim and Reggie arrived and killed it. I had never really seen freestyle too much in person and was super stoked to have those guys come up. Both of them were super cool and professional. They even invited me to join in and I got to skate and showcase my flat land street style, plus launch ramp skills.… I was skating with pros and had to step up my game. …Reggie was smooth and stylish with Ollies, throwing in sweet G-Turns, etc. ...I didn’t know how impressed they were with me until a few weeks later when I got a call at the shop from Bruce Walker offering me a full sponsorship simply based on the word of Jim and Reggie.
 Former professional skater Kevin Shelton tells a similar story. Shelton was from the small town of Mars Hill, North Carolina, and went to California in an unsuccessful attempt to turn his skating hobby into a career. When he returned to North Carolina, Shelton ran into Barnes "who realized Shelton’s potential. Shelton then began to get paid [by Endless Grind] for traveling and performing street-style demonstrations throughout the East Coast." In 1986, Barnes gave Shelton his "big break," a chance to skate before Bruce Walker. Two years later, Shelton was a professional skater with full sponsorship by Walker Skateboards.
 Founder and curator of the Morro Bay Skateboard Museum Jack Smith said "I declared myself 'professional' so I could enter the freestyle event at the Trans-World Skateboarding Championship—one of the largest international tournaments in sport's history, held in conjunction with the World Exp in Vancouver, Canada. …Reggie Barnes…was amongst the first to introduce himself and encourage me during the Vancouver freestyle event."
 Mike Sinclair, skating's most famous team manager who also ran ESPN's Real Street, got his start through Barnes' Endless Grind. Sinclair says, "I skated for Endless Grind skate shop for a long time when I lived in North Carolina. Reggie Barnes who owns it asked me if I could manage the team for him since Eastern Skateboard Supply was taking off and he was focusing on that. My duties were mainly keeping track of whose entry fees got paid for when we went to contests. I think everyone from our area just said they were on Endless Grind and tried to charge it to Reggie at all the local contests. Reggie paid me $100 a month to do this for him. I was beyond hyped! Later, I worked at the shop and just did it for free or until the contest scene died out in the mid-'90s."
 In 2006, Swedish pro-skater Stefan "Lillis" Akesson recalled attending the Münster Monster Mastership (World Cup) in 1987. He wrote, "We (me, Shane Rouse and Reggie Barnes) stayed in Christian Seewaldt's apartment. …Reggie was working on his board, putting on sho-goo [sic] on the tail and gave me some secret tips on how to do it, something Shane always refused to help me with." In the competition, Rouse came in 2nd, Barnes 3rd, Akesson 4th, and Seewaldt 5th. In his pro-career, Akesson would surpass Barnes, placing 1st or 2nd at the International Freestyle Competition from 2000 to 2007, and earning 1st place again in 2011. Akesson wrote, "Reggie…is a super nice person!"

Personal 
In the early 1980s, Barnes returned to North Carolina and attended the Cape Fear Technical Institute (now Cape Fear Community College) where he majored in business. He stayed in Wilmington after graduating, and supported his surfing and lifestyle with his carpentry and construction business. Soon after, he opened Eastern Skateboard Supply and Endless Grind, both which continue as successful businesses.

Barnes currently lives in Wrightsville Beach, North Carolina, which is adjacent to Wilmington. He has two children: daughter Lindsey and son Mason who is a professional surfer. Barnes tries to surf every day, runs marathons, and competes in the downhill skateboard slalom. He says, "The sport has kept me young at heart and has helped me stay in good physical condition."

References 

1960s births
Year of birth uncertain
Living people
People from Cary, North Carolina
American skateboarders
Sportspeople from North Carolina
People from Wilmington, North Carolina
Business executives
American male film actors
Sportspeople from Wilmington, North Carolina
20th-century American male actors
21st-century American businesspeople
20th-century American businesspeople